Timboon may refer to:

Timboon, a town in Australia
Timboon railway line
Timboon Railway Shed Distillery

See also
Tim Boon